Bennetts River is a stream in northern Arkansas and southern Missouri.
The stream source is in Howell County, Missouri southeast of Hocomo on US 160. It flows south to the west of Moody, Missouri and crosses under Missouri Route 142. The stream flows south into Fulton County, Arkansas and turns to a westerly direction northwest of Viola. The stream crosses Arkansas Route 87 just south of Vidette and flows into Baxter County, Arkansas, and on into the northeast arm of Norfork Lake (Bennetts Bayou) across from the Gamaliel Campground.

Bennetts River has the name of has the name of the local Bennett family.

See also
List of rivers of Arkansas
List of rivers of Missouri

References

Rivers of Baxter County, Arkansas
Rivers of Fulton County, Arkansas
Rivers of Howell County, Missouri
Rivers of Missouri
Rivers of Arkansas